Oskar Leopold Karlweis (often credited Oscar Karlweis; 10 July 1894 – 24 January 1956) was an Austrian-American stage and film actor, active internationally.

Career 
Born in Hinterbrühl, Austria-Hungary, he was the son of playwright Carl Karlweis and younger brother of the writer . Karlweis abandoned his youthful law studies for the stage, first for eight years at Vienna's Stadttheater. After service in World War I, he was active with Max Reinhardt's Theater in der Josefstadt in Vienna, followed by engagements at various theaters in Munich and Vienna, and then to the Berlin stage where he had a popular following playing singing and dancing roles, including as Prinz Orlofsky in Die Fledermaus.  His general manner was humorous, charming, naive, and cheerful.

In Berlin between 1930 and 1933 he worked as a recording artist and acted in more than a dozen German light comedy and musical films, most famously as one of Lilian Harvey's suitors in the hugely successful operetta film The Three from the Filling Station.

With Hitler's rise to power in 1933, Karlweis, who was Jewish, returned to the Austrian stage; but with the Nazi Anschluss in 1938 he was again forced to flee, first to Switzerland and then Paris where, at both locations, he took to the stage with fellow Austrian law school dropout, writer/director, and cabaret performer Karl Farkas. When German forces took Paris in 1940, Karlweis, along with his friend Austrian writer Friedrich Torberg, fled via Spain to Portugal, whence they made their way to New York.

Not knowing English, Karlweis was at first limited to acting in German emmigré productions, but he soon got his English legs and appeared in eight Broadway shows in the early 1940s, including the title role in Franz Werfel's long-running "Jacobowsky and the Colonel," garnering outstanding reviews.

In the early 1950s Karlweis played supporting roles in TV productions and in several Hollywood and European films. He died in 1956 of a heart attack in New York, and is interred at the Matzleinsdorf Protestant Cemetery in Vienna.

Personal life
In 1946, Karlweis married theatrical and film producer Ninon Tallon, the niece of three-time prime minister of France Édouard Herriot. She continued to use his surname professionally until after his death.

Selected filmography
 The Bohemian Dancer (1926)
 Give Me Life (1928)
 Love in the Cowshed (1928), as Wedelski, Oberleutnant a.D. 
 Two Hearts in Waltz Time (1930), as Nicky Mahler
 A Tango for You (1930), as Flooch
 The Three from the Filling Station (1930), as Kurt
 Dolly Gets Ahead (1930), as Fred Halton
 The Firm Gets Married (1931), as Solly Friedländer
 The Forester's Daughter (1931), as Wolfgang Amadeus Mozart
 Der Tanzhusar (1931), as Turi Weidinger
 Mamsell Nitouche (1931), as Célestin
 The Men Around Lucy (1931), as Robert
 The Concert (1931), as Doctor Jura
 The Naked Truth (1932)
 Spell of the Looking Glass (1932), as Menzel
 Three on a Honeymoon (1932), as Heinz Schaller
 The Gentleman from Maxim's (1933), as Werner Radke
 No Day Without You (1933), as Leo
 Today Is the Day (1933), as Peter Schlemm
 Voices of Spring (1933), as Franz Waldmüller
 Last Love (1935), as Teddy Langhammer
 Everything for the Company (1935), as Otto Sonndorfer
 St. Benny the Dip (1951), as Mr. Kovacs
 5 Fingers (1952), as Moyzisch
 Anything Can Happen (1952), as Uncle Besso
 Tonight We Sing (1953), as Benjamin Golder
 The Juggler (1953), as Willy Schmidt
 Dutch Girl (1953), as Professor Schmidtchen
 Meet Me in Las Vegas (1956), as Lotzi

Bibliography
 Palmer, Jean Michel. Weimar in Exile: The Antifascist Emigration in Europe And America. Verso, 2006.
 Traubner, Richard. Operetta: A Theatrical History. Psychology Press, 2003.
 Weniger, Kay: 'Es wird im Leben dir mehr genommen als gegeben ...' Lexikon der aus Deutschland und Österreich emigrierten Filmschaffenden 1933 bis 1945: Eine Gesamtübersicht (Hamburg: ACABUS Verlag, 2011). , 9783862821426

References

External links

Oskar Karlweis at Virtual History

1894 births
1956 deaths
Austrian male television actors
Austrian male film actors
Austrian male silent film actors
Male actors from Vienna
Jewish emigrants from Austria to the United Kingdom after the Anschluss
Austrian male stage actors
20th-century Austrian male actors